Cities and towns under the oblast's jurisdiction (12):
Rostov-on-Don (Ростов-на-Дону) (administrative center)
city districts:
Kirovsky (Кировский)
Leninsky (Ленинский)
Oktyabrsky (Октябрьский)
Pervomaysky (Первомайский)
Proletarsky (Пролетарский)
Sovetsky (Советский)
Voroshilovsky (Ворошиловский)
Zheleznodorozhny (Железнодорожный)
Azov (Азов)
Bataysk (Батайск)
Donetsk (Донецк)
Gukovo (Гуково)
Kamensk-Shakhtinsky (Каменск-Шахтинский)
Novocherkassk (Новочеркасск)
Novoshakhtinsk (Новошахтинск)
Shakhty (Шахты)
Taganrog (Таганрог)
Volgodonsk (Волгодонск)
Zverevo (Зверево)
Districts (43):
Aksaysky (Аксайский)
Towns under the district's jurisdiction:
Aksay (Аксай)
with 10 selsovets under the district's jurisdiction.
Azovsky (Азовский)
with 18 selsovets under the district's jurisdiction.
Bagayevsky (Багаевский)
with 5 selsovets under the district's jurisdiction.
Belokalitvinsky (Белокалитвинский)
Towns under the district's jurisdiction:
Belaya Kalitva (Белая Калитва)
Urban-type settlements under the district's jurisdiction:
Sholokhovsky (Шолоховский)
with 10 selsovets under the district's jurisdiction.
Bokovsky (Боковский)
with 7 selsovets under the district's jurisdiction.
Chertkovsky (Чертковский)
with 14 selsovets under the district's jurisdiction.
Dubovsky (Дубовский)
with 13 selsovets under the district's jurisdiction.
Kagalnitsky (Кагальницкий)
with 8 selsovets under the district's jurisdiction.
Kamensky (Каменский)
Urban-type settlements under the district's jurisdiction:
Gluboky (Глубокий)
with 11 selsovets under the district's jurisdiction.
Kasharsky (Кашарский)
with 10 selsovets under the district's jurisdiction.
Konstantinovsky (Константиновский)
Towns under the district's jurisdiction:
Konstantinovsk (Константиновск)
with 6 selsovets under the district's jurisdiction.
Krasnosulinsky (Красносулинский)
Towns under the district's jurisdiction:
Krasny Sulin (Красный Сулин)
Urban-type settlements under the district's jurisdiction:
Gorny (Горный)
Uglerodovsky (Углеродовский)
with 12 selsovets under the district's jurisdiction.
Kuybyshevsky (Куйбышевский)
with 3 selsovets under the district's jurisdiction.
Martynovsky (Мартыновский)
with 9 selsovets under the district's jurisdiction.
Matveyevo-Kurgansky (Матвеево-Курганский)
with 8 selsovets under the district's jurisdiction.
Millerovsky (Миллеровский)
Towns under the district's jurisdiction:
Millerovo (Миллерово)
with 12 selsovets under the district's jurisdiction.
Milyutinsky (Милютинский)
with 7 selsovets under the district's jurisdiction.
Morozovsky (Морозовский)
Towns under the district's jurisdiction:
Morozovsk (Морозовск)
with 8 selsovets under the district's jurisdiction.
Myasnikovsky (Мясниковский)
with 7 selsovets under the district's jurisdiction.
Neklinovsky (Неклиновский)
with 18 selsovets under the district's jurisdiction.
Oblivsky (Обливский)
with 7 selsovets under the district's jurisdiction.
Oktyabrsky  (Октябрьский)
Urban-type settlements under the district's jurisdiction:
Kamenolomni (Каменоломни)
with 11 selsovets under the district's jurisdiction.
Orlovsky (Орловский)
with 11 selsovets under the district's jurisdiction.
Peschanokopsky (Песчанокопский)
with 9 selsovets under the district's jurisdiction.
Proletarsky (Пролетарский)
Towns under the district's jurisdiction:
Proletarsk (Пролетарск)
with 9 selsovets under the district's jurisdiction.
Remontnensky (Ремонтненский)
with 10 selsovets under the district's jurisdiction.
Rodionovo-Nesvetaysky (Родионово-Несветайский)
with 6 selsovets under the district's jurisdiction.
Salsky (Сальский)
Towns under the district's jurisdiction:
Salsk (Сальск)
with 10 selsovets under the district's jurisdiction.
Semikarakorsky (Семикаракорский)
Towns under the district's jurisdiction:
Semikarakorsk (Семикаракорск)
with 9 selsovets under the district's jurisdiction.
Sholokhovsky (Шолоховский)
with 9 selsovets under the district's jurisdiction.
Sovetsky (Советский)
with 3 selsovets under the district's jurisdiction.
Tarasovsky (Тарасовский)
with 10 selsovets under the district's jurisdiction.
Tatsinsky (Тацинский)
Urban-type settlements under the district's jurisdiction:
Zhirnov (Жирнов)
with 10 selsovets under the district's jurisdiction.
Tselinsky (Целинский)
with 9 selsovets under the district's jurisdiction.
Tsimlyansky (Цимлянский)
Towns under the district's jurisdiction:
Tsimlyansk (Цимлянск)
with 6 selsovets under the district's jurisdiction.
Ust-Donetsky (Усть-Донецкий)
Urban-type settlements under the district's jurisdiction:
Ust-Donetsky (Усть-Донецкий)
with 7 selsovets under the district's jurisdiction.
Verkhnedonskoy (Верхнедонской)
with 10 selsovets under the district's jurisdiction.
Vesyolovsky (Весёловский)
with 4 selsovets under the district's jurisdiction.
Volgodonskoy (Волгодонской)
with 7 selsovets under the district's jurisdiction.
Yegorlyksky (Егорлыкский)
with 9 selsovets under the district's jurisdiction.
Zavetinsky (Заветинский)
with 9 selsovets under the district's jurisdiction.
Zernogradsky (Зерноградский)
Towns under the district's jurisdiction:
Zernograd (Зерноград)
with 8 selsovets under the district's jurisdiction.
Zimovnikovsky (Зимовниковский)
with 11 selsovets under the district's jurisdiction.

References

Rostov Oblast
Rostov Oblast